Semyon Fyodorovich Zhavoronkov (– 6 June 1967) was an officer of the Soviet Naval Air Force.

Zhavoronkov was born in the village of Sidorovskaya, Kostroma Governorate, and from 1910 worked in a textile factory in nearby Vichuga. He was Commanding General of the Soviet Naval Air Force during World War II (1939–1945). Under his leadership, aviators of the Baltic Fleet's Order of the Red Banner made a number of air strikes on military and industrial facilities in and around Berlin that began in August and September 1941. In February 1945, Zhavoronkov organized the flights of delegations to the Yalta Conference. From 1949 to 1957, he was head of Aeroflot, the Soviet national civilian airline. He retired from the military in 1959.

References 

1899 births
1967 deaths
People from Vichuga
Communist Party of the Soviet Union members
Lenin Military Political Academy alumni
Recipients of the Order of Kutuzov, 2nd class
Recipients of the Order of Lenin
Recipients of the Order of Nakhimov, 1st class
Recipients of the Order of the Red Banner
Recipients of the Order of the Red Banner of Labour
Recipients of the Order of Ushakov, 1st class

Soviet Air Force marshals
Soviet military personnel of the Russian Civil War
Soviet military personnel of the Winter War
Soviet Navy personnel
Soviet World War II pilots
Burials at Novodevichy Cemetery